Michel d'Aillières (17 December 1923, Paris - 31 October 2010) was a French politician. He represented the National Centre of Independents and Peasants from 1958 to 1962 and the Independent Republicans from 1962 to 1977 in the National Assembly. He was a Senator from 1977 to 1995 and the mayor of Aillières-Beauvoir from 1953 to 2008.

References

1923 births
2010 deaths
Politicians from Paris
National Centre of Independents and Peasants politicians
Independent Republicans politicians
Deputies of the 1st National Assembly of the French Fifth Republic
Deputies of the 2nd National Assembly of the French Fifth Republic
Deputies of the 3rd National Assembly of the French Fifth Republic
Deputies of the 4th National Assembly of the French Fifth Republic
Deputies of the 5th National Assembly of the French Fifth Republic
French Senators of the Fifth Republic
Mayors of places in Pays de la Loire
Senators of Sarthe